Pitvaros is a village in Csongrád county, in the Southern Great Plain region of southern Hungary.

Geography 

External links 
 Hungarian Wikipedia page
 local government
 village page (HUN)
 school home page (HUN)
 PVT (HUN)
 local attractive (HUN)
 list (HUN)

Populated places in Csongrád-Csanád County
Shtetls
Slovak communities in Hungary